Bruhn is a surname. Notable people with the surname include:

Annika Bruhn (born 1992), German swimmer
Erik Bruhn (1928–1986), Danish choreographer
Friedrich Wilhelm Gustav Bruhn (1853–1927), German inventor
Karl von Bruhn (1803–?), German journalist
Rolf Wallgren Bruhn (1878-1942), Canadian politician
Siglind Bruhn (born 1951), German musicologist and concert pianist

See also 
Bruun

German-language surnames